Aralez, also called arlez or yaralez (modern Armenian ), are winged dog-like creatures or spirits in Armenian mythology that descend to lick the wounds of dead heroes in order to resurrect them.

The aralezes are most prominently associated with the story of the legendary Armenian king Ara the Handsome. According to this legend, the Assyrian queen Semiramis (Shamiram) called on the aralezes to lick the wounds of and revive Ara the Handsome after he was killed battle. By popular interpretation, this was the origin of the word aralez, from the name "Ara" and lez, the root of the word  'to lick'. According to the Armenian history attributed to Faustus of Byzantium, after Mushegh Mamikonyan was killed, his relatives placed his corpse on a tower, hoping that the aralezes would revive him. This indicates that belief in the aralezes was still current in fourth- and fifth-century Armenia, following the Christianization of the country.

It has been suggested that tower-like structures in Armenia and Anatolia may have been associated with belief in the aralezes.

Etymology 
The etymology of the word aralez is disputed. Interpretations of the word as being composed of the name "Ara (the Handsome)" and lez, or yar ("eternally") and lez are regarded as folk etymologies.

See also 
 Q'ursha

References

Bibliography 

 
 
 
 
 
 
 

Armenian legendary creatures
Mythological dogs
Mount Ararat